In legal terminology, a rescript is a document that is issued not on the initiative of the author, but in response (it literally means 'written back') to a specific demand made by its addressee. It does not apply to more general legislation.

Overview
The word originated from the Roman imperial court, which often issued rescripts, in many cases prompted by its many governors and other officials. Some important early legal collections were composed entirely of rescripts, for instance the Codex Hermogenianus, published around AD 300. The other main field of application is the papal Roman Curia, which adopted many Roman administrative terms and practices.

Rescripts may take various forms, from a formal document of an established type, such as a Papal Bull, to the forwarding of the demand with a simple mention by way of decision, something like "rejected" or "awarded", either to the party concerned or to the competent executive office to be carried out.

By analogy it is also applied to similar procedures in other contexts, such as the Ottoman, Chinese and Japanese imperial courts, or even prior to the Roman empire. Two well-known examples of Japanese Imperial rescripts were Emperor Hirohito's 1945 Imperial Rescript on the Termination of the War written in response to the Potsdam Declaration and his 1946 Humanity Declaration written in response to a request by General Douglas MacArthur.

Papal rescripts

Papal rescripts concern the granting of favours or the administration of justice under canon law.  In Roman Catholicism rescripts are responses in writing by the pope or a Congregation of the Roman Curia to queries or petitions of individuals.

French legal system
In France, people have the possibility to ask an administration for a rescrit (rescript), which means that they will present to the competent administration a circumstanced particular case, and obtain a formal answer (the rescrit) by the administration explaining how the law will be applied to the submitted particular case. The rescript is binding for the administration, and may be used before a court of law to exonerate the person who asked for the rescript in case of prosecution. In English common law such a hypothetical process is not allowed, and cases must be determined on fact.

U.S. legal system
The Massachusetts appellate courts issue rescripts to the lower courts. These are the equivalent of mandates (i.e. writs of mandamus) in federal appellate practice.

See also
Imperial Rescript on Education
Imperial Rescript to Soldiers and Sailors
Imperial Rescript on the Termination of the War
Declaratory Rescript of the Illyrian Nation

References

Catholic canonical documents
Common law legal terminology
Legal documents
 
Catholic Church legal terminology
Civil law legal terminology
French legal terminology